Elian Çelaj (born 3 February 1999) is an Albanian footballer who plays as a midfielder.

Career

KF Luftëtari
Çelaj began his professional career with Luftëtari, joining the club in August 2018 after leaving the Partizani Tirana academy. He made his competitive debut for the club on 12 September 2018 in a 4–0 victory over Vora in the Albanian Football Cup. In his first season, Çelaj made just nine league appearances, eight of which were off the bench, tallying 223 total minutes. With Luftëtari struggling financially following the 2018–19 season, Çelaj dissolved his contract with the club.

References

External links

1999 births
Living people
Luftëtari Gjirokastër players
Flamurtari Vlorë players
FK Kukësi players
Kategoria Superiore players
Albanian footballers
Sportspeople from Tirana
Association football midfielders